Electronic Quarterback is a handheld electronic game made by Coleco in 1978. It is powered by a 9-volt battery or an AC adaptor, and it differentiated itself from the other similar handheld electronic American football games of the era, notably Mattel Electronics's version, by having two blockers and giving the quarterback the ability to pass.

Like many electronic games in the late 1970s, it was also released by Sears under their own brand and the name Electronic Touchdown.

Gameplay
The game plays a simplified version of American football with three offensive players and either six or seven computer-controlled defensive players depending on the player-selected difficulty. As implied by the game's name, the focus is on running and passing; gameplay proceeds essentially without punts or kickoffs. Kickoffs typically result in a touchback, with the following drive starting at the 20-yard line; however, according to the game's instruction manual, occasionally the game allows a kickoff to be run back.

References

American football video games
Handheld electronic games
Products introduced in 1978
Video games developed in the United States
1970s toys